"E.I." is a song by American rapper Nelly. Released as the second single on October 17, 2000, from his debut album Country Grammar, it peaked at number 11 on the UK Singles Chart and 16 on the U.S. Billboard Hot 100. A remix of the song, called "Tip Drill", was released in 2003 along with lyrics and a music video that drew controversy for its misogynistic themes.

Remixes
"Tip Drill", or "E.I. (Remix)" is the name of a 2003 remix of the song. It appeared as the fourth track on his 2003 remix album Da Derrty Versions: The Reinvention. An alternate version featuring vocals from Nelly's group, the St. Lunatics, which is listed as the "Tip Drill Remix", appears as the final track on Da Derrty Versions: The Reinvention. Both versions were produced by David Banner.

The song's music video (directed by Solomite), made for the version featuring the St. Lunatics, became controversial for overtly depicting women as sexual objects. It was meant to be a single but was withdrawn due to its potentially offensive content. Despite this, Nelly's solo version of the song received moderate airplay on urban contemporary radio stations in the United States and peaked at number 65 on the US Hot R&B/Hip-Hop Songs chart in early 2004.
Features cameo appearances by Jermaine Dupri and David Banner.

In one interpretation of the song's meaning by Mark Anthony Neal, the phrase tip drill is a "ghetto colloquialism for the proverbial ugly girl with a nice body."

Controversy

In 2004, women's studies students at Spelman College in Atlanta, Georgia protested against misogyny in rap music and "Tip Drill" specifically. The students criticized the negative portrayal and sexual objectification of African-American women in the video, which showed women in bikinis dancing and simulating various sexual acts, men throwing money on women's breasts and buttocks, and Nelly swiping a credit card between a woman's buttocks after which it starts bouncing. Nelly's 4Sho4Kids Foundation was scheduled to hold a bone marrow drive on campus to help his sister who suffered from leukemia: Spelman Feminist Majority Leadership Alliance President Moya Bailey and Leana Cabral named Nelly the "Misogynist of the Month" and the flyers they and other members placed on campus prompted the foundation to cancel the drive. The president of the Student Government, Asha Jennings, said: "Nelly wants us to help his sister, but he's degrading hundreds of us." According to Spelman students, Nelly's Foundation refused to hold the drive unless the university promised that students would not confront him about his song and the video. The Foundation canceled the drive.

In 2008, Nelly stated that his own daughter, Chanelle, had never seen the video.

Track listings

UK CD single
 "E.I." (clean edit with FX)
 "Greed, Hate, Envy"
 "E.I." (instrumental)
 "E.I." (video)

UK 12-inch single
A1. "E.I." (album version)
B1. "E.I." (instrumental)
B2. "E.I." (clean edit with FX)

UK cassette single
 "E.I." (clean edit with FX)
 "Greed, Hate, Envy"
 "E.I." (instrumental)

European CD single
 "E.I." (clean radio edit with FX)
 "Come Over"

Australian CD single
 "E.I." (clean radio edit with FX) – 4:12
 "Greed, Hate, Envy" – 4:15
 "E.I." (instrumental) – 4:45
 "Come Over" – 4:13

Charts and certifications

Weekly charts

Year-end charts

Certifications

Release history

References

External links
 

2000 singles
2000 songs
Music video controversies
Music videos directed by Director X
Nelly songs
Songs written by Jay E
Songs written by Nelly
Universal Records singles